The South Sudanese Ambassador in Beijing is the official representative of the Government in Juba to the Government of the People's Republic of China.

List of representatives

References 

Ambassadors of South Sudan to China
China
South Sudan